Vaidas Mizeras (born August 9, 1973) is a Lithuanian sprint canoer who competed from the mid-1990s to the early 2000s (decade). At the 1996 Summer Olympics in Atlanta, he was eliminated in the semifinals of both the K-2 500 m and the K-2 1000 m events. Four years later in Sydney, Mizeras was eliminated in the semifinals of the K-1 1000 m event.

References
Sports-Reference.com profile

1973 births
Canoeists at the 1996 Summer Olympics
Canoeists at the 2000 Summer Olympics
Living people
Lithuanian male canoeists
Olympic canoeists of Lithuania